Poppy-Grace Stickler (born 12 June 2006) is a Welsh artistic gymnast.  She is the 2019 Northern European all-around silver medalist.  She represented Wales at the 2022 Commonwealth Games.

Early life 
Stickler was born in Cardiff in 2006.  She attends Whitchurch High School.

Gymnastics career

Junior

2017–18 
Stickler competed at her first Welsh Championships in 2017.  She placed fourth in the espoir division.  In 2018 Stickler competed at her first British Championships where she placed eleventh in the espoir division.  Additionally she won bronze on balance beam behind Alia Leat and Mali Morgan.  Stickler made her international debut for Wales at the 2018 Africa Safari International where she helped Wales finish second as a team.  Individually she finished seventh in the all-around, fourth on vault, and fifth on floor exercise.  She ended the year competing at the British Team Championships where she helped Club Cymru Caerdydd finish first as team and individually Stickler finished third in the all-around.

2019 
Stickler competed at the Welsh and British Championships early in the year.  In April she competed at the Pre-Olympic Youth Cup where she placed first in the all-around in the 2006 division.  At the British Team Championships Stickler finished third in the all-around.  In September Stickler competed at the Northern European Championships.  While there she helped Wales finish first as a team.  Individually she won silver in the all-around behind fellow Welsh gymnast Emily Thomas.  Additionally she finished seventh on balance beam and fifth on floor exercise.  Stickler ended the year competing at the Olympic Hopes Cup.  While there she helped Wales finish second as a team behind China.  Individually she won bronze on vault and floor exercise.

Junior

2020–21 
Due to the global COVID-19 pandemic most competitions were canceled or postponed in 2020.  Stickler competed at the 2021 British Championships where she placed third in the all-around and first on vault and floor.

Senior

2022 
Stickler became age-eligible for senior competition in 2022.  Early in the year she competed at the Welsh and British Championships, placing second in the all-around at the former and third on floor exercise at the latter.  Stickler made her international senior debut for Great Britain at the Koper Challenge Cup.  She won silver on floor exercise behind Ana Đerek.

Stickler was selected to represent Wales at the 2022 Commonwealth Games.  While there she helped the team finish fifth.  Individually she placed fifth in the all-around and sixth on floor exercise.  Stickler next competed at the Paris Challenge Cup where she placed sixth on floor exercise.

In October Stickler was named as the alternate for the team competing at the 2022 World Championships.  During the team final she was on the competition floor supporting the team who won a historic silver medal, Great Britain's highest finish at a World Championships.

Competitive history

References

External links
 

2006 births
Living people
British female artistic gymnasts
Welsh female artistic gymnasts
Commonwealth Games competitors for Wales
Gymnasts at the 2022 Commonwealth Games
Medalists at the World Artistic Gymnastics Championships